Hocking Hills Reservoir locally nicknamed Rose Lake is located just outside Old Man's Cave, in the Hocking Hills region of Hocking County, Ohio, United States. It is a part of the Hocking Hills State Park.

Location 

It is accessed via the crossing of the Old Man's Cave gorge and following the signs - about a  hike.  There is no direct road access, though a shortcut may be found via a trail from a primitive campground which borders the lake.

Hocking Hills reservoir is the approximate midpoint of a trail between Old Man's Cave and Cedar Falls. Specifically, it is found on the Upper Gorge Trail.

Hocking Hills Reservoir was formed via the creation of a dam. According to local legend the lake is haunted. Since the park which it is a part of closes at dusk, investigation of said claims is limited to those wishing to stay in the primitive campground, or whom venture in during the day. Regardless, the details, in brief, involve a mother who was looking for her lost child after dark and proceeded to fall off a cliff.

Another "haunting" tail involves the demise of a man who committed suicide in the lake. Fishermen are said to see underwater lights, or a pacing figure on the shore who disappears.

Rose Hollow valley

Rose Lake 
 
Officially, Rose Lake is actually this other lake in Hocking County, Ohio.

References

External links
Haunted Hocking Hills, Rose Lake

Hocking Hills
Reservoirs in Ohio
State parks of Ohio
Bodies of water of Hocking County, Ohio